Diproteverine (usually as diproteverine hydrochloride) is a calcium channel blocker.

References 

Calcium channel blockers
Phenol ethers
Isopropyl compounds